Dylan James Thomas (born 14 February 1996) is a New Zealand field hockey player, who plays as a forward.

Personal life
Dylan Thomas was born and raised in Tokoroa, New Zealand.

In his youth, Thomas moved to Hastings, where he was a student at Hastings Boys' High School.

Career

Domestic competitions

Ford NHL
Dylan Thomas was a member of the Central Mavericks in the Ford National Hockey League (NHL), representing the team from 2015 to 2019. During his time with the team, Thomas won bronze medal in the 2016 edition of the tournament.

Premier Hockey League
Following the overhaul of the NHL and subsequent introduction of the Premier Hockey League, Thomas was named in the Central Falcons. The league's inaugural edition was held in 2020, with the team taking home a gold medal.

National teams

Under-21
In 2016, Thomas made two appearances for the New Zealand U-21 team. His first was at the Sultan of Johor Cup in Johor Bahru, followed by the FIH Junior World Cup in Lucknow.

Black Sticks
Thomas made his official debut for the Black Sticks in 2018, during a test series against Japan in Maibara.

Following his debut, Thomas was named in the Black Sticks squad on a permanent basis. His first major tournament with the team was the 2019 FIH Pro League. He followed this up with appearances in a test series against Japan in Stratford, as well as the FIH Olympic Qualifiers.

In 2020, Thomas was named in the Black Sticks squad for the 2021 Olympic Year.

International goals

References

External links
 
 
 
 
 

1996 births
Living people
Male field hockey forwards
New Zealand expatriate sportspeople in Germany
Sportspeople from Tokoroa
New Zealand male field hockey players
Field hockey players at the 2020 Summer Olympics
Olympic field hockey players of New Zealand
Field hockey players at the 2022 Commonwealth Games
20th-century New Zealand people
21st-century New Zealand people